"Freaky Friday" is a song recorded by American rapper Lil Dicky, featuring guest vocals from American singer Chris Brown and uncredited vocals from Ed Sheeran, DJ Khaled, and Kendall Jenner. Written by Dicky, Brown, Ammo, Nicholas Audino and produced by Mustard, Benny Blanco and Twice as Nice, it was released by Dirty Burd on March 15, 2018, alongside its music video.

The song became Lil Dicky's most successful single. It peaked at number eight on the Billboard Hot 100. Outside of the United States, "Freaky Friday" topped the charts in New Zealand and the United Kingdom, and peaked within the top ten of the charts in Australia, Belgium (Wallonia), Canada, Denmark, and the Republic of Ireland.

Composition
"Freaky Friday" is a comedy hip hop song featuring a pop rap light-synthed Mustard and Benny Blanco production.

Lil Dicky, not having released anything for three years before this single, wanted to prove himself to release the best song he could've done, and after that the concept of the song came to him, he decided to realize it with Chris Brown, being considered by him to be the best example of a superstar he would have liked to collaborate with, and the singer was welcomed to complete the song.

Storyline
In the song the artists comically take up the concept of the novel that goes by the same name, swapping their bodies, namely that of a charismatic and controversial superstar (Chris Brown), and that of an emerging artist with a basic life (Lil Dicky).

In the song Dicky is euphoric waking up being Brown, and rejoices because he is rich, handsome, famous, surrounded by beautiful girls and able to sing and dance. Going crazy off his euphoria he calls Kanye West to tell him that he is his biggest fan, and then he realizes that he has a daughter. Meanwhile, Brown in Dicky's body is still dissatisfied with the mediocrity of his life, but he's pleased by the fact that no one judges him in a racist way, due to him being African American or due to the controversies of his past. Subsequently Dicky in Chris' body goes crazy to another level, being exalted by his attractive sexual performances, he posts photos of his penis on the Internet, and when the real Chris sees them starts looking desperately for him, finding him in the private location of a nightclub. He bursts and threatens him, but Dicky warns him that beating him would only mean hurting himself, making him realize that he loves himself, that being the key for both to go back into each others' bodies.

Music video
The music video parodies the 2003 remake of the Lindsay Lohan film Freaky Friday and features cameos from Jimmy Tatro, Ed Sheeran, DJ Khaled and Kendall Jenner. As of April 2021, the video has over 700 million views on YouTube. The video shows Lil Dicky at a Chinese restaurant, similar to the 2003 film, Freaky Friday, where a character is at a Chinese restaurant and wishes she was somebody else. In the music video, Lil Dicky is approached by a fan, played by Jimmy Tatro, who mentions he is a fan of his work. He then says to his girlfriend who he is accompanied by that he is a comedic rapper, who is not that impressive of a rapper. Lil Dicky then says to himself he wishes he was somebody who could dance, and who had credibility. The camera then pans to Chris Brown on television, mentioning he wishes he was somebody else as well. The Chinese waiter takes note of it, and gives Lil Dicky a fortune cookie. The video then shows Lil Dicky, supposedly in the body of Chris, and vice versa. The song illustrates the two in each other's bodies. Towards the end, the two are about to fight, and they realize they should not kill each other, and instead love each other. They realize that this will set them back to their original form. The video then ends with cameos from Ed Sheeran, DJ Khaled and Kendall Jenner, where Lil Dicky is then in possession in all of their bodies.

Controversy
Shortly after the song's release, the Virginia Tech Hokies women's lacrosse team was heavily scrutinized after members of the team uploaded a video of themselves singing along to Chris Brown's verse, where he (supposedly as Lil Dicky in his body) starts saying "What up my nigga" to everyone he encounters. Virginia Tech coach John Sung later apologized on behalf of the team, saying it was a "teachable moment" for the players and that "no malice was involved... They just thought they were just singing along to a song".

Credits and personnel
Credits adapted from Tidal.

 Lil Dicky – composition, engineering
 Chris Brown – composition
 Cashmere Cat – composition
 Lewis Hughes – composition
 Wilbart McCoy III – composition
 Ammo – composition
 Mustard – composition, production
 Benny Blanco – composition, production
 Twice as Nice – composition, production
 Serban Ghenea – mix engineering
 Patrizio Pigliapoco – engineering

Charts

Weekly charts

Year-end charts

Certifications

Release history

References

2018 singles
2018 songs
Lil Dicky songs
Chris Brown songs
Songs written by Chris Brown
Songs written by Cashmere Cat
Songs written by Ammo (record producer)
Number-one singles in New Zealand
Song recordings produced by Benny Blanco
Song recordings produced by Mustard (record producer)
Song recordings produced by Cashmere Cat
Comedy rap songs
UK Singles Chart number-one singles
Fiction about body swapping
Pop-rap songs